Charles Ronald "Choo-Choo" Justice (May 18, 1924 – October 17, 2003) was an American football halfback in the National Football League for the Washington Redskins.  He was inducted into the College Football Hall of Fame.

Early life
Born in Asheville, North Carolina, Justice attended and played high school football at Lee H. Edwards High School (now Asheville, N.C., High School), where he was a part of two undefeated seasons. He averaged 25 yards per rush his last year in high school. His senior year, his team outscored the opposition 400-6.

World War II
After high school, Justice spent four years in the Navy in World War II.  During that time, he played on the football team at United States Naval Training Center Bainbridge. His nickname Charlie "Choo Choo" was given to him because of the way he dodged tackles. One of the officers remarked, "He looks like a runaway train, we ought to call him Choo Choo."

College career
After the war, Justice was heavily recruited by Duke, North Carolina, and South Carolina. He was quoted as saying that he believed that an athlete should play in the state that he is going to make his career in, so he chose the University of North Carolina.  Being a war veteran, he knew he had no need of an athletic scholarship. Justice sent a proposal to both universities asking each to allow him to attend on his G.I. tuition money and give the scholarship to his wife. Only North Carolina accepted this. Thus Justice attended and played college football at the University of North Carolina under Carl Snavely, where he played tailback for four years.  Justice was also an active member of the Beta Theta Pi fraternity in his years at UNC.  While there, he was named an All-American in 1948 and 1949, and finished second in the Heisman Trophy voting both years.  While at North Carolina, Justice ran or threw for 64 touchdowns and set a team total-offense record of 4,883 yards, which stood until 1994.

He was named the Most Valuable Player in the 1950 College All-Star Game, when he led the college team to a 17-7 win over the Philadelphia Eagles. He ran for 133 yards which was 48 yards more than the entire Eagles Team. He had runs of 33 and 45 yards and caught a pass for 40 yards.

During college, Johnny Long and his Orchestra recorded the song "All the Way, Choo Choo."

Professional career
Justice was drafted in the 16th round of the 1950 NFL Draft by the Washington Redskins, but his professional career was hampered and ultimately cut short by injuries.

In an exhibition game in 1952 in the Los Angeles Memorial Coliseum Justice rushed 11 times for 199 yards (18.1 average), with runs of 46, 65 and 54 yards. He sustained a broken arm in the third quarter.

After football
After football, Justice owned an insurance firm.  He and his wife, Sarah, had a son, Ronnie, and a daughter, Barbara.  He died in 2003. In 1970, the University of North Carolina dedicated a section of its athletic center in his name, calling it the Charlie Justice Hall of Honor.  Justice Street in Chapel Hill, NC is named after him.  He was also named one of the all time 70 Greatest Redskins.  In 1999, Sports Illustrated named Justice the 14th Greatest North Carolina Sports Figure. The 22 (his jersey number at UNC) yard line hashmarks at Kenan Memorial Stadium are colored blue in his honor.

References

External links

 
 
 

1924 births
2003 deaths
American football halfbacks
Bainbridge Commodores football players
North Carolina Tar Heels football players
Washington Redskins players
All-American college football players
College Football Hall of Fame inductees
Sportspeople from Asheville, North Carolina
Players of American football from North Carolina
United States Navy personnel of World War II